The 2010 North African Futsal Cup was the 3rd Championship and it took place in Misrata, Libya from September 20-26, 2010, Organised by the Union of North African Football Federations. Palestine were invited after the withdrawal of Egypt.

Group stage

Matches

Honors

 Best player:  Rabie Hoty
 Best goalkeeper:  Mohamed Sharif
 Best scorer:  Hamdi Shwein

See also
Futsal Planet

2010
2010 in futsal
2010
2010–11 in Libyan football
2010–11 in Tunisian football
2010–11 in Algerian football
2010–11 in Moroccan football